, also known as Shiroyama Hakusan, is a Shinto shrine located in the city of Nagoya, central Japan.

History 
The shrine is located on the premises of the ruined Suemori Castle. The castle itself dates back to the 16th century. The shrine hosts night-time festivals (matsuri) in both July and October, featuring traditional Japanese music and dance performances.

An unusual feature is a sacred Marital Tree, whose trunk split into two parts and grew back together at a later time. This tree is worshipped as a symbol of happy marriage and restoration of relationships.

Access by public transport is Motoyama Station on the Higashiyama Line and then a five minutes walk uphill to the north.

External links 
 Homepage of Shiroyama Hachiman Shrine

Chikusa-ku, Nagoya
Shinto shrines in Nagoya
Hachiman shrines